Sebastián Decoud defeated 7–6(2), 6–1 Simon Greul in the first singles' final of this tournament.

Seeds

Draw

Final four

Top half

Bottom half

References
 Main Draw
 Qualifying Draw

Rai Open - Singles
2009 Singles